Optimisation of cutting cycles in conventional underground coal sections to improve productivity is an area of study on the utilisation of machines in conventional underground coal sections. 

Utilisation of machines focuses on reducing the time that machines spend idle and increasing the amount of time during shifts that machines are actively contributing to production. This can be addressed through effective planning of the cutting cycle parameters or by adjusting the design of machines to modify the cutting cycles.

Conventional coal mining
Conventional underground coal mining relies upon the use of continuous miners in order to extract coal reserves from underground coal seams. In combination with the continuous miners, shuttle cars are used to transport the extracted coal from the face to a transfer point (feeder breaker). From there the coal is typically tipped onto the underground conveyor system, which transports the coal to the surface in order to be distributed to customers. Effective management of the cutting, loading and tipping cycles utilised in the sections serve as a possible area for productivity improvement.

One-directional cutting cycle
A one-directional cutting cycle currently utilised in underground coal sections progresses as follows:
 The continuous miner operator sumps the cutterhead to a depth of 900 mm at a distance of ±0.3 mm below the actual roof height
 The operator then operates the shear cylinders in order to lower the cutterhead and shears down with the help of gravity to cut the coal from the seam
 The operator continues this shearing process while periodically loading the shuttle cars by means of the flight chain conveyor
 When the cutterhead reaches the floor level, the operator trams the machine backwards and trims the floor in order to remove the step and ensure a level floor
 The continuous miner is repositioned and the cutting cycle is repeated until the heading has advanced the maximum allowable distance before roof support is to be installed
 The cutterhead is then raised and the roof is trimmed to the required seam height to ensure an even roof profile, preventing the occurrence of bad roof conditions
The cutterhead in the case of the above-mentioned cutting cycle always shears from the roof down to the floor. By adjusting the parameters relating to the above-mentioned cutting cycle, the utilisation of the available production times can be improved.

Modified bi-directional cutting cycle
The design of modern machines is continuously improving  and the introduction of machines that have the ability to shear upwards has led to the option to modify the typical cutting cycle in an attempt to improve the productivity of conventional underground coal sections. The utilisation of the Sandvik MC 470  machine is an example of an instance where the operation of the machine enables the utilisation of a more productive cutting cycle. This is accomplished by enabling the machine to shear both down and up by sumping the cutterhead near the floor and near the roof, respectively. The modified cutting cycle typically progresses as follows: 
 
 The continuous miner operator trams the machine towards the face with a lowered spade and cutterhead
 The cutterhead is sumped to a depth of 700 mm and the upwards shearing operation is initiated
 The upwards shearing is continued until the cutterhead reaches the predetermined seam height
 The cutterhead is then sumped into the top of the face to a depth of 700 mm again and the downwards shearing operation is initiated
 The downwards shearing is continued until the predetermined floor level is reached
 The continuous miner is then trammed backwards in order to trim to ensure a level floor
 Once the floor has been levelled the cutting cycle is repeated by sumping the cutterhead near the floor again and repeating the above-mentioned operation
 When the heading has advanced to the maximum allowable distance before the roof has to be supported, the cutterhead is raised to the predetermined seam height and the roof is trimmed while the machine is trammed backwards, away from the face

Key performance indicators
 Number of shuttle car loads is defined as the total number of fully loaded shuttle cars that were loaded at the continuous miner and subsequently tipped at the feeder breaker. 
 Average shuttle car load time refers to the average time in seconds that was necessary to load a shuttle car to its maximum coal-carrying capacity.
 Average shuttle car change time refers to the average time in seconds that was necessary for an unloaded shuttle car to be repositioned behind the continuous miner after the previously loaded shuttle car trammed away from the machine towards the tipping point.
 Conveyor on time refers to the total time in minutes that the flight chain conveyor on the continuous miner was running.
 Cutter ON - Conveyor OFF - bunker operation [min]– bunker operation refers to the total time in minutes that ONLY the cutterhead was running and coal was being stored on the spade.
 Shuttle car away time refers to the total time in minutes that was utilised by a loaded shuttle car to travel from the continuous miner to the feeder breaker, tip the loaded coal and travel back to the continuous miner to be loaded again.
 Cutter operation time refers to the total time in minutes that the cutterhead was running.
 Relocation time refers to the total time in minutes that was utilised in order to relocate a continuous miner to a different heading after the maximum allowable unsupported length of the previously cut heading was reached.

Utilisation of the modified cutting cycle has improved the general consistency of the production machines in achieving the target values of the key performance indicators. This is confirmed by means of continuous production reporting that monitors and documents the key performance indicators on a shift basis. The following table shows an example of a typical summary of key performance indicators and the actual numbers achieved. It is illustrative of the success with which the bi-directional cutting cycle is being run at a South African coal mine.

 
 
From these figures it is clear that the number of shuttle car loads is significant and above target. The shuttle car change time is also significantly impacted.

Cutting cycle comparison
In order to justify the selection and utilisation of the bi-directional cutting cycle a comparison is to be made between the one-directional and bi-directional cutting cycle. Different Key performance indicators are utilised by different companies to quantify the performance of machines operating in production sections. The most appropriate figure to be utilised in the justification of the bi-directional cutting cycle is the tons per hour figure. The increase in the production rate due to the improved cutting cycle serves as the differentiating figure. Through analysis of several production reports from South African coal mines, the following comparative figures were obtained for the two cutting cycles.

 
From the above-mentioned averages obtained from production reports it is clear that the bi-directional cutting cycle maintains a larger average production rate. This increase in the production rate serves as the justification of the utilisation of the improved cutting cycle and illustrates the value of the consideration of manageable and adjustable elements of the production process in conventional underground coal mine sections.

References

Coal mining